Pointe de la Fournache is a mountain of Savoie, France. It lies in the Massif de la Vanoise range.

Pointe de la Fournache lies north of Aussois and southwest of Dent Parrachée. The summit is very close to Dent Parrachée, which is separated by a short ridge.

References
Some of the content of this article comes from the equivalent French-language Wikipedia article.

Alpine three-thousanders
Mountains of the Alps
Mountains of Savoie